William de Oliveira Pottker (born 22 February 1993) is a Brazilian footballer who plays as a forward for Coritiba, on loan from Cruzeiro.

Club career
Born in Florianópolis, Pottker graduated with Figueirense's youth setup. On 7 September 2011 he made his first team – and Série A – debut, coming on as a second-half substitute in a 1–1 away draw against Atlético Goianiense.

Pottker was subsequently loaned to Gandzasar, Ventforet Kofu, Red Bull Brasil and Linense, scoring 5 goals with the latter in 2015 Campeonato Paulista. On 16 May 2015 he was loaned to S.C. Braga in a season-long deal, with a buyout clause.

After only appearing for Braga's B-team in Segunda Liga, Pottker returned to Brazil and played for Linense, on loan, until the end of 2016 Campeonato Paulista. On 5 May 2016, after scoring seven goals, he signed a three-year contract with Ponte Preta.

Pottker finished the tournament with a career-best 14 goals (being also the top scorer among Fred and Diego Souza), being a key unit as his side finished eighth; highlights included a brace in a 3–0 away win over Santa Cruz on 30 June 2016. He also topped the charts in the 2017 Campeonato Paulista with nine goals, as Ponte finished second.

On 16 February 2017, Pottker was sold to Internacional, but remained at Ponte until the end of the year's Paulistão.

On 18 July 2017, he made his debut for Internacional, against Luverdense, scoring the only goal of the game in the 93rd minute.

Career statistics

Honours

Individual
Campeonato Brasileiro Série A Top Goalscorer: 2016
Campeonato Paulista Player of the year: 2017
Campeonato Paulista Countryside player of the year: 2017
Campeonato Paulista Team of the year: 2017
Campeonato Paulista Top scorer: 2017

References

External links

1993 births
Living people
Sportspeople from Florianópolis
Brazilian footballers
Association football forwards
Campeonato Brasileiro Série A players
Campeonato Brasileiro Série B players
J1 League players
UAE Pro League players
Figueirense FC players
Clube Atlético Linense players
Associação Atlética Ponte Preta players
Sport Club Internacional players
Cruzeiro Esporte Clube players
Avaí FC players
Coritiba Foot Ball Club players
Armenian Premier League players
FC Gandzasar Kapan players
Ventforet Kofu players
Liga Portugal 2 players
S.C. Braga B players
Al-Wasl F.C. players
Brazilian expatriate footballers
Expatriate footballers in Armenia
Brazilian expatriate sportspeople in Japan
Expatriate footballers in Japan
Brazilian expatriate sportspeople in Portugal
Expatriate footballers in Portugal
Expatriate footballers in the United Arab Emirates
Brazilian expatriate sportspeople in the United Arab Emirates